Saint Gerland of Agrigento, also known as Gerland of Besançon (d. 25 February 1100) was a bishop of Agrigento in Sicily.

History
Believed to have been a native of Besançon, he was a relative of the Norman Roger I of Sicily. After the expulsion of the Saracens from Sicily, in 1088 (or 1093) Roger summoned Gerland as the first post-Saracen bishop of Agrigento, to re-establish the church throughout the island.

He was canonised in 1159. His relics are in a silver urn in Agrigento Cathedral, which has been dedicated to him since its rebuilding by bishop Bertaldo di Labro in 1305.

His feast day is 25 February.

References

Sources and external links
 Santi e Beati: San Gerlando 
 The cult of Saint Gerland at Porto Empedocle 
 lavalledeitempli.it: Agrigento Cathedral 

Bishops in Sicily
People from Agrigento
1100 deaths
Sicilian saints
Year of birth unknown
Religious leaders from the Province of Agrigento